The Brainwashing of My Dad is a 2015 American documentary film directed by Jen Senko about her father's transformation from a nonpolitical Democrat into a political Republican. The film was mostly funded by a Kickstarter campaign.

Synopsis 
As Jen Senko tries to understand the transformation of her father from a nonpolitical Democrat to an angry Republican fanatic, she uncovers the forces behind the media that changed him completely: a plan by Roger Ailes under President Richard Nixon for a media takeover by the Republicans, the 1971 Powell Memo urging business leaders to influence institutions of public opinion (especially the media, universities, and courts), the 1987 dismantling of the Fairness Doctrine under President Ronald Reagan, and the signing of the 1996 Telecommunications Act under President Bill Clinton. The documentary aims to show how the media and the nation changed, which leads to questions about who owns the airwaves, what rights listeners and watchers have, and what responsibility the government has to keep the airwaves fair, accurate, and accountable.

Content
Senko's father, Frank, was originally a "nonpolitical Kennedy Democrat" who began changing into a far-right Republican in the 1980s, she said. On her father's lengthy commute to his place of employment, he listened to conservative talk radio, which Senko believes started the change in her father's personality. In particular, he listened to Rush Limbaugh and watched Fox News. Towards the end of his life, Frank's views mostly changed back to being somewhere in the middle due to his wife exposing him to less biased media. He died in January 2016 at the age of 93.

Production
The film gained 947 backers on Kickstarter; people who noticed the campaign wrote to Senko and she followed up by Skype to receive their stories, which were later put into the film. One Kickstarter backer, Ryan Smith, became an executive producer and provided the remaining funding needed. Archivist Richard Kroll was hired to search for photographs and video material.

Reception
Marsha Lederman of The Globe and Mail wrote a mixed review of the film, saying that the film's topics are "fascinating" but that its examination feels "shallow". David Berry of National Post wrote a negative review, calling the film "stunningly naive in both conception and execution, with PowerPoint DIY realness". Carole Di Tosti of Blogcritics wrote a positive review, saying that "The documentary is well edited and tells a fascinating story of propagandists, stealth and wealth. Senko exposes how the conservative media network seeded anti-democratic values by changing the issues to 'morality and family values' [...] diverting the focus from economic equality."

References

External links

2015 films
2015 documentary films
Documentary films about American politics
American documentary films
2010s English-language films
2010s American films